Lauria sempronii, is a species of air-breathing land snail, a terrestrial pulmonate gastropod mollusk in the family Lauriidae.

Distribution
This species is known to occur in a number of countries and islands:
 Great Britain
 and other areas

References

External links

 AnimalBase information at: 

Lauria (gastropod)
Gastropods described in 1837